The 1959–60 Michigan Wolverines men's basketball team represented the University of Michigan in intercollegiate basketball during the 1959–60 season.  The team finished the season in tenth place in the Big Ten Conference with an overall record of 4–20 and 1–10 against conference opponents.

William Perigo was in his eighth and final year as the team's head coach.  Junior John Tidwell was the team's leading scorer with 520 points in 24 games for an average of 21.6 points per game. Tidwell broke the Michigan record for single game scoring record on February 27, 1960, as he hit 17 of 25 field goals and seven of ten free throws for 41 points in a 72–65 win against Michigan State.  Tidwell's 41 points also broke the Yost Fieldhouse record which had been set by Indiana's Don Schlundt with 29 points in 1953.  Tidwell also broke the season scoring record with 520 points.  At the end of the 1959–60 basketball season, Tidwell was selected as the team's most valuable player and elected captain of the 1960–61 team.

Lovell Farris led the team with 233 rebounds.

Statistics

Team players drafted into the NBA
One player from this team were selected in the NBA Draft.

References

Michigan
Michigan Wolverines men's basketball seasons
Michigan Wolverines basketball
Michigan Wolverines basketball